The All-America City Award is a community recognition program in the United States given by the National Civic League. The award recognizes the work of communities in using inclusive civic engagement to address critical issues and create stronger connections among residents, businesses and nonprofit and government leaders. Once called by the organization the "Nobel Prize for Constructive Citizenship," it has been awarded to more than 500 communities across the country. The award is open to all American communities ranging from major cities and regions to towns, villages, counties, neighborhoods and tribes.

Since the program's inception in 1949, more than 500 communities have been named "All-America Cities". Each year, interested communities submit a comprehensive package based on published criteria that are evaluated in the award selection process. Deserving communities are named as finalists, and the year's ten award winners are named from that pool of applicants. Representatives from the finalist communities then travel to Denver to present the story of their work and their community to a jury of national experts. The awards conference includes workshops on promising practices.

References

External links
 The All-America City Program

American awards
Cities in the United States
Awards established in 1949
1949 establishments in the United States
Community awards